Senator Pindall may refer to:

James Pindall (1783–1825), Virginia State Senate
Xenophon Overton Pindall (1873–1935), Arkansas State Senate